Stade Municipal Saint-Symphorien is a multi-purpose stadium located on the "island Saint-Symphorien" in Longeville-lès-Metz, near Metz, France.  It is currently used mostly for football matches, by FC Metz. The stadium is able to hold 30,000 people and was built in 1923.

References

Saint-Symphorien
FC Metz
Sports venues completed in 1923
Multi-purpose stadiums in France
Buildings and structures in Metz
Sport in Metz
Sports venues in Moselle (department)
1923 establishments in France